Lee Sook-ja (born 17 June 1980) is a South Korean retired volleyball player. She was part of the team at the 2012 Summer Olympics. She participated in the 2011 FIVB World Grand Prix.

On 2014, Lee announced her retirement. She later became a commentator on KBS Sports.

References

External links 
FIVB profile

1980 births
Living people
South Korean women's volleyball players
Volleyball players at the 2012 Summer Olympics
Olympic volleyball players of South Korea